Gamma FC was a Hungarian football club from the town of Budafok, Budapest.

Name Changes
 1918–1938: Gammagyár
 1938–1939: Szentimrevárosi SE (SZISE)
 1939–1944: Gamma FC
 1945–1946: Budai Barátság SE
 1946: Budai Munkás SE
 1947–1949: MATEOSZ Munkás SE
 1949–1950: Budapesti Teherfuvar SE

Managers
 József Ember (1945–46)
 Tivadar Király (1946–47)
 Péter Szabó  (1948–49)
 Imre Hermann (1949–50)

References

External links
 Profil

Defunct football clubs in Hungary
1929 establishments in Hungary
1950 disestablishments in Hungary
Football clubs in Budapest
Association football clubs established in 1929
Association football clubs disestablished in 1950